Te Aratai College (founded as Linwood High School, then renamed Linwood College from 2000–2021) is a co-educational secondary school in Linwood, a suburb of Christchurch, New Zealand.

History
Founded in the early 1950s to cater for the secondary educational needs of a growing population in eastern Christchurch, Linwood High School became one of New Zealand's larger secondary schools during the 1970s, with a roll of over 1600 pupils at one point. However, as it also served a relatively low socio-economic area of industrial southeast Christchurch, and promoted sporting achievement alongside academic achievement, the school gained a reputation for being "rough".

Following the introduction of the 1989 Tomorrow's Schools policy, the role declined from about 1500, in 1990, to 775, in 2000. Much of this decline was attributed to the relaxation of school zoning restrictions and the resulting white flight by affluent families within the large south-eastern Christchurch catchment area sending their children to higher decile schools, that had a better academic reputation.

In 1975 the school began to take in deaf students from Van Asch College.

With the appointment of a new principal, Rob Burrough, in 2000, the school undertook a rebranding exercise, changing the name from High School to College, and, consulting with both students and the community, rethought how it taught students. By 2004 the roll had climbed to 1080, academic results were above the New Zealand average and sports participation had noticeably increased.

In 2010, principal Rob Burrough resigned to take up a head-teacher post in Mombasa, Kenya. In 2015, Richard Edmundson was appointed principal. Since his appointment he has overseen the rebuild of the Linwood College campus as well as the introduction of a new enrolment scheme in 2020.

2010–11 earthquakes
Linwood College suffered the loss of a Year 11 student in the February 2011 Christchurch earthquake. School buildings sustained moderate damage in the quake and the college was forced to site-share with Cashmere High School while repairs were undertaken at the Linwood site. Staff and students returned to the Linwood campus in August 2011.

2022 Te Aratai College 
In 2022, with the completion of the rebuild of its campus, Linwood College was renamed Te Aratai College, which means "pathway to the sea." The name was gifted by Te Ngāi Tūāhuriri Rūnanga. With the rebuild and introduction of new zoning, the college is anticipated to grow to 1800 students over the next ten years.

In August 2022, Te Aratai College attracted domestic media attention after the White supremacist Philip Arps nominated himself for a position on the school's board of trustees. Following the Christchurch mosque shooting in 2019, Arps had been sentenced to 21 months in jail for sharing footage of the mosque shootings. He took advantage of a legal loophole allowing people who had not been sentenced to prison for two years to contest school trustee board elections. In response, Christchurch City councillor Sarah Templeton,  Secondary Principals' Association president Vaughan Couillault, and retired Labour Party Member of Parliament Liz Gordon called for legislative changes to ensure that extremists were not elected to school boards. On 13 September, Arps failed in his bid to be elected to the school's board of trustees, receiving 25 votes (2.6 percent).

Enrolment 
At 1 July 2021, Te Aratai College had 754 students enrolled, of which 56% were male and 44% were female. By prioritised ethnicity, 34% of students identified as Māori, 20% as Asian, 9% as Pacific Islanders, 1% as another minority ethnicity, and 35% as European.

Staff
Former teaching staff have included:
 John Graham – All Black
 Paul Ackerley – Olympic gold medalist, Hockey, 1976
 Brenda Rowberry – Former Silver Fern
 Chris Arthur – Former New Zealand Black Stick

Notable alumni

 Ann Boelee – teacher & member of the New Zealand national netball team that won the 1967 world cup
 Kees Bruin – painter
 Sir Kerry Burke – local body politician
 Guy Cotter – mountaineer & CEO of Adventure Consultants
 Tony Fomison –  a notable New Zealand artist
 Mike Hosking – TV and radio presenter
 April Ieremia – former Silver Fern and television presenter
 Rodney Latham – New Zealand cricketer
 Saskia Leek – a New Zealand painter
 Rodney Macann – opera singer
 Max Merritt – singer/songwriter
 Matthew Palmer – Justice of the High Court of New Zealand
 Dick Motz – a notable New Zealand cricketer
 Scribe – rap artist
 Anna Simcic-Forrest – swimmer, Commonwealth Games gold medallist
 Llew Summers – a sculptor based in Christchurch
 Tiki Taane – singer/songwriter; former lead singer of Salmonella Dub
 Paul Reid – Actor on Shortland street, Singer Songwriter for Rubicon, Real estate investor
 Brent Todd – rugby league player
 Kevin Trenberth – USA based climate change scientist

References

External links
 

Secondary schools in Christchurch
Educational institutions established in 1954
1954 establishments in New Zealand